Thomas Bridson Cribb (1 December 1845 – 4 September 1913) was a politician in Queensland, Australia. He was a Member of the Queensland Legislative Assembly and the Queensland Legislative Council.

Early life
Thomas Bridson Cribb was born on 1 December 1845 in London, England, the son of Benjamin Cribb and his wife Elizabeth (née Bridson). He immigrated with his parents on the Chaseley arriving in Moreton Bay in May 1849.

He was educated privately and was one of the foundation scholars at Ipswich Boys' Grammar School.

He was a partner in the family retail business, Cribb & Foote

On 3 June 1874, he married Marian Lucy Foote, daughter of John Clarke Foote (his father's business partner in Cribb & Foote).

The Cribb and Foote families were active in Queensland politics, with Thomas's father Benjamin Cribb, his uncle Robert Cribb, his brother James Clarke Cribb, his wife's father John Clarke Foote and his wife's uncle James Foote all member of the Queensland Parliament.

Politics
Cribb was appointed to the Queensland Legislative Council on 23 May 1893. Although a lifetime appointment, he resigned on 13 March 1896 to stand for election for the Legislative Assembly in the 1896 election.

As a Ministerialist, Cribb represented the electoral district of Ipswich in the Queensland Legislative Assembly from 21 March 1896, holding the seat through the 1899 and 1902 elections. From 1 February 1902 to 17 September 1903, he served as the Treasurer of Queensland. As Treasurer, he introduced income tax in Queensland in December 1902 with the Income Tax Act 1902. The tax was very unpopular, leading to Cribb being defeated in the 1904 election on 27 August by Labor candidate William Ryott Maughan.

Cribb contested Ipswich again in the 1907 election but was unsuccessful.

Cribb was re-appointed to the Queensland Legislative Council on 14 June 1913, but he was already suffering ill-health and died 3 months later on 4 September 1913.

Later life
Cribb died on 4 September 1913 at his residence at Southport, Queensland, following an illness of some duration. His funeral was conducted at his home town of Ipswich and proceeded to the Ipswich General Cemetery.

See also
 Members of the Queensland Legislative Council, 1890–1899; 1910–1916
 Members of the Queensland Legislative Assembly, 1896–1899; 1899–1902; 1902–1904

References

External links
 

Members of the Queensland Legislative Assembly
Members of the Queensland Legislative Council
1845 births
1913 deaths
Burials at Ipswich General Cemetery
Pre-Separation Queensland